Delta Pyxidis (δ Pyxidis) is binary star system in southern constellation of Pyxis. Having an apparent visual magnitude of +4.877, it is bright enough to be visible to the naked eye. Based upon an annual parallax shift of 13.19 mas as seen from Earth, it is located around 250 light years from the Sun.

This is an astrometric binary system, as determined by changes in the proper motion of the primary. The visible component has a stellar classification of A3 IV, indicating it has the spectrum of an A-type subgiant star that is consuming the last of the hydrogen at its core. At the age of around 296 million years, it is 92.5% of the way through its main sequence lifetime and is spinning with a projected rotational velocity of 68 km/s. The star has an estimated 1.8 times the mass of the Sun and about 1.6 times the Sun's radius. It is radiating 59 times the Sun's luminosity from its photosphere at an effective temperature of roughly 8,609 K.

References

A-type subgiants
Astrometric binaries
Pyxidis, Delta
Pyxis (constellation)
Durchmusterung objects
076483
043825
3556